Western Academy Broadcasting College commonly abbreviated as WABC, is a broadcasting college in Saskatoon, Saskatchewan. The college is known for graduates such as TSN's Darren Dreger and Darren Dutchyshen, as well as Sportsnet's Daren Millard and Peter Loubardias.

PROFILE OF WESTERN ACADEMY BROADCASTING COLLEGE

website: http://www.wabcwesternacademy.com

RADIO TRAINING

Western Academy Broadcasting College specializes in broadcast training instructed by Professional Canadian Broadcasters. The main focus of these courses is to develop on-the-air talent which showcases every student's ability and personality. This objective is achieved by individual instruction within small group sessions. Through these sessions every individual gets practice in professional broadcasting studios in a variety of roles: radio personality, commercial announcing and broadcast journalism.

Western Academy Broadcasting College also offers voice training program which features a combination of different voice training techniques utilized by successful broadcasters and announcers. The training program takes you on a journey of microphone techniques, script reading, radio dj shows, and news and sports broadcasting.

TELEVISION STUDIO

WESTERN ACADEMY offers an intensive course in Television Studio Production. The program is designed to   develop skills and give comprehensive insight into TV studio practices. Students will experience hands-on contact with broadcast calibre TV equipment, and will have introduction to professional procedures and ideas currently utilized by the professional Television Industry.
The WESTERN ACADEMY Television Training program offers a strong emphasis on skills development in utilizing contemporary broadcast TV Studio equipment including cameras, switching control boards,  Graphics Character Generator, and TV Audio equipment.

TELEVISION REPORTING & EDITING

WESTERN ACADEMY offers an intensive advanced television training course in using a single camera outside the studio for gathering news stories in the real world.  It's referred to as ENG (Electronic News Gathering) and EFP (Electronic Field Production). This program is designed to develop skills and give comprehensive insight into video shooting and reporting  "on location".  Students will have introduction to techniques,  procedures and ideas currently used by the professional Television Industry. The video is then edited and assembled into the finished product.  Field Camera Video involves planning the video shots, camera position, sequences and segments.  Emphasis is on enhancing good visual story development for the viewing audience.

References

External links 
 
 
 

Broadcasting schools
Education in Saskatoon
Educational institutions in Canada with year of establishment missing
Colleges in Saskatchewan